Dante's Disneyland Inferno is the ninth studio album by American experimental rock band Sun City Girls, released in 1996 by Abduction Records.

Track listing

Disc one

Disc two

Personnel
Alan Bishop - Bass, Wooden Guitar, Vocals, Melodica, Percussion, Harmonica, Autoharp, Flutes, Bells, Burmese Banjo
Richard Bishop - Guitar, Piano, Organ, Keyboards, Harmonica, Kalimba, Typewriter, Autoharp, Tibetan Horns, Bells, Mandolin, Vocals
Damon Bostrom - DX7 (Disc 1, Track 15)
Scott Colburn - Mixing, Bongos (Disc 1, Track 1), Vocals (Disc 1, Tracks 3 & 12/Disc 2, Tracks 1, 2, & 14), Piano (Disc 2, Tracks 12 & 17), Organ (Disc 2, Track 14)
Eddy Detroit - Percussion (Disc 2, Track 3), the goat (Disc 2, Track 13)
Crystal Gallegos - Vocals (Disc 1, Track 2)
Charles Gocher - Vocals, Drums, Gongs, Bells, Marimba, Piano, Mandolin, Orchestra Bells
Heidi Peterson - Vocals (Disc 1, Track 16)

Release history

References

External links 
 

1996 albums
Sun City Girls albums
Locust Music albums